Selsoviet (tr. sieĺsaviet;  ; , silrada) is a shortened name for a rural council and for the area governed by such a council (soviet). Selsoviets were the lowest level of administrative division in rural areas in the Soviet Union. After the dissolution of the Soviet Union, they were preserved as a third tier of administrative-territorial division throughout Ukraine, Belarus, and some of the federal subjects of Russia.

A selsoviet is a rural administrative division of a district that includes one or several smaller rural localities and is in a subordination to its respective raion administration.

The name refers to the local rural self-administration, the rural soviet (council), a part of the Soviet system of administration. A selsoviet was headed by a chairman, who had to be appointed by higher administration.

For a considerable period of Soviet history, passports of rural residents were stored in selsoviet offices, and people could not move outside their area of residence without the permission of selsoviet.

Selsoviets in Russia
Division into selsoviets as administrative-territorial units remained after the dissolution of the Soviet Union in many of the federal subjects of Russia.

In modern Russia, a selsoviet is a type of an administrative division of a district in a federal subject of Russia, which is equal in status to a town of district significance or an urban-type settlement of district significance, but is organized around a rural locality (as opposed to a town or an urban-type settlement). In some federal subjects, selsoviets were replaced with municipal rural settlements, which, in turn, were granted status of administrative-territorial units.

Prior to the adoption of the 1993 Constitution of Russia, this type of administrative division had a uniform definition on the whole territory of the Russian SFSR. After the adoption of the 1993 Constitution, the administrative-territorial structure of the federal subjects is no longer identified as the responsibility of the federal government or as the joint responsibility of the federal government and the federal subjects. This state of the matters is traditionally interpreted by the governments of the federal subjects as a sign that the matters of the administrative-territorial divisions are the sole responsibility of the federal subjects themselves. As a result, the modern administrative-territorial structures of the federal subjects vary significantly from one federal subject to another; that includes the manner in which the selsoviets are organized and the choice of a term to refer to such entities.

As of 2013, the following types of such entities are recognized:
Inhabited locality: in Krasnoyarsk Krai (together with selsoviets)
Rural administration: in the Republic of Kalmykia and in Tula Oblast (together with rural okrugs, rural territories, and volosts)
Rural administrative okrug: in Bryansk Oblast
Rural okrug: in the Mari El Republic, the Republic of North Ossetia–Alania, and the Sakha Republic; in Krasnodar Krai (together with stanitsa okrugs); in Belgorod, Kaliningrad, Kirov, Omsk, Ryazan, Tula (together with rural administrations, rural territories, and volosts), Tyumen, Ulyanovsk, and Yaroslavl Oblasts
Rural settlement: in the Altai and the Chuvash Republics; in Amur, Moscow, Rostov, Smolensk, Tver, and Voronezh Oblasts
Rural territory: in Kemerovo Oblast and Tula Oblast (together with rural administrations, rural okrugs, and volosts)
Rural-type settlement administrative territory: in the Komi Republic (together with selo administrative territories)
Selo administrative territory: in the Komi Republic (together with rural-type settlement administrative territories)
Selsoviet: in the Republics of Bashkortostan, Buryatia (together with somons), Dagestan, Khakassia (together with settlement councils), Mordovia, and the Udmurt Republic; in Altai (together with settlement administrations), Krasnoyarsk (together with inhabited localities), and Stavropol Krais; in Arkhangelsk, Astrakhan, Chelyabinsk, Kurgan, Kursk, Lipetsk, Nizhny Novgorod, Orenburg (together with settlement councils), Oryol, Penza, Tambov, Volgograd, and Vologda Oblasts; in Nenets Autonomous Okrug (together with settlements)
Settlement: in Kostroma and Novgorod Oblasts
Settlement: in Nenets Autonomous Okrug (together with selsoviets)
Settlement administration: in Altai Krai (together with selsoviets)
Settlement council: in the Republic of Khakassia (together with selsoviets) and in Orenburg Oblast (together with selsoviets)
Settlement municipal formation: in Leningrad Oblast
Somon: in the Republic of Buryatia (together with selsoviets)
Sumon: in the Tyva Republic
Stanitsa okrug: in Krasnodar Krai (together with rural okrugs)
Territorial okrug: in Murmansk Oblast
Volost: in Pskov Oblast and Tula Oblast (together with rural administrations, rural okrugs, and rural territories)

See also
 Municipal council

References

Legislatures of the Soviet Union
Types of administrative division
Subdivisions of Belarus
Administrative divisions of Russia
Subdivisions of Ukraine
Russian-language designations of territorial entities
Soviet phraseology